Taraval and 44th Avenue is a light rail stop on the Muni Metro L Taraval line, located in the Parkside neighborhood of San Francisco, California. The station opened with the second section of the L Taraval line on January 14, 1923.

Service 
Since August 2020, service along the route is temporarily being provided by buses to allow for the construction of improvements to the L Taraval line. The project is expected to wrap up in 2024.

Reconstruction 

Like many stations on the line, Taraval and 44th Avenue had no platforms; trains stopped at marked poles before the cross street, and passengers crossed travel lanes to board. In March 2014, Muni released details of the proposed implementation of their Transit Effectiveness Project (later rebranded MuniForward), which included a variety of stop changes for the L Taraval line. The stops at 44th Avenue would be removed to improve stop spacing on the line.

On September 20, 2016, the SFMTA Board approved the L Taraval Rapid Project. Early implementation of many changes, including stop eliminations, occurred on February 25, 2017. The stops at 44th Avenue were temporarily kept in response to neighborhood concerns. If further study indicated the stop should be retained, concrete boarding islands would be installed during the main construction phase. In November 2017, Muni staff proposed to remove the stop to improve reliability and restore parking spaces. However, the SFMTA Board voted in December 2017 to retain the stop and construct boarding islands.

Construction on the first phase of the project, between 33rd Avenue and 46th Avenue, began in September 2019. When Muni Metro service resumed on August 22, 2020, after a five-month closure during the COVID-19 pandemic, L Taraval service remained suspended west of Sunset Boulevard for construction. Rail service was re-replaced with buses on August 25 due to issues with malfunctioning overhead wire splices and the need to quarantine control center staff after a COVID-19 case. Construction of the eastbound platform began on December 10, 2020; construction of the westbound platform began on January 4, 2021. The first phase of the project, including the platforms at 44th Avenue, was completed in July 2021.

References

External links 

SFMTA: Taraval St & 44th Ave eastbound and westbound
SF Bay Transit (unofficial): Taraval St & 44th Ave

Muni Metro stations
Railway stations in the United States opened in 1923